Nelson was an electoral district of the Legislative Assembly in the Australian state of Western Australia from 1890 to 1950.

The district was based in the south-western part of Western Australia, including towns such as Manjimup and Pemberton, and was named for the Nelson land district which formed its original boundaries. It was one of the original 30 seats contested at the 1890 election. In 1898, its major settlement was Bridgetown and it also included the Greenbushes tin fields.

Nelson was abolished at the 1950 election. Its last member, Ernest Hoar of the Labor Party, transferred to the new seat of Warren.

Members

Election results

References

Nelson